William Baxter may refer to:

Politicians 

William Baxter (Nova Scotia politician) (1760–1832), physician and politician in Nova Scotia
William Edward Baxter (1825–1890), British politician and traveller
William Duncan Baxter (1868–1960), mayor of Cape Town, South Africa, 1907–1908
 William Baxter (Scottish politician) (1911–1979), British Labour Party politician, MP 1959–1974

Scholars and educators 

 William Baxter (scholar) (1650–1723), Welsh scholar
 William Baxter (Oxford Botanic Garden curator) (1787–1871), Scots botanist, author of British Phaenogamous Botany
 William Baxter (botanist) (died c. 1836), English botanist who collected in Australia
 William Baxter (law professor) (1929–1998), American law professor
 William H. Baxter (born 1949), American linguist
 William Baxter (clergyman) (1820–1880), second president of Arkansas College

Other 
 William Giles Baxter (1856–1888), English cartoonist
 William Robert Baxter (born 1960), British hospitality entrepreneur
 William "Bucky" Baxter (1955–2020), American guitarist
 Will Baxter, a fictional character in Eureka Seven anime series

See also
Bill Baxter (disambiguation)
Billy Baxter (disambiguation)